20th Century, also known as The Best of 3X Krazy, is the first compilation album released by 3X Krazy.  It was released on October 10, 2000 and was a double CD.

Track listing

References

3X Krazy compilation albums
2000 greatest hits albums
Albums produced by Bosko
Gangsta rap compilation albums